Brandon Parker Vick (born 1984) is an American politician of the Republican Party. He is a member of the Washington House of Representatives, representing the 18th district, first elected to that position in 2012. He first ran for office against Ann Rivers for the seat in 2010, but lost. He once served as chairman of the Clark County Republican Party.

Awards 
 2014 Guardians of Small Business award. Presented by NFIB.

References 

1984 births
Living people
Republican Party members of the Washington House of Representatives
21st-century American politicians